This article lists the albums attributed to the Mobile Suit Gundam SEED series.

Soundtracks

Mobile Suit Gundam SEED Original Soundtrack I 

Mobile Suit Gundam SEED Original Soundtrack I is the first soundtrack album of Mobile Suit Gundam SEED. Included in this album are the first ending theme "Anna ni Issho Datta no ni (TV Size)" by See-Saw, and "Shizuka na Yoru ni", the insert song in phase 07, 08, 09, 14 & 20 – performed by Rie Tanaka as Lacus Clyne.

Catalog number: VICL-61000

Mobile Suit Gundam SEED Original Soundtrack II 

Mobile Suit Gundam SEED Original Soundtrack II is the second soundtrack album of Mobile Suit Gundam SEED.

Catalog number: VICL-61110

Mobile Suit Gundam SEED Original Soundtrack III 

Mobile Suit Gundam SEED Original Soundtrack III is the third soundtrack album of Mobile Suit Gundam SEED. Included in this album are the first ending theme "Anna ni Issho Datta no ni" by See-Saw and the first opening theme "Invoke" by T.M.Revolution, both songs are in TV size edit.

Catalog number: VICL-61196

Mobile Suit Gundam SEED Original Soundtrack IV 

Mobile Suit Gundam SEED Original Soundtrack IV is the last soundtrack album of Mobile Suit Gundam SEED. Included in this album are all ending and opening themes of the series in TV size mix.

Catalog number: VICL-61500

Mobile Suit Gundam SEED Destiny Original Soundtrack I 

Mobile Suit Gundam SEED Destiny Original Soundtrack I is the first soundtrack album of Mobile Suit Gundam SEED Destiny. Included in this album is "Fields of Hope", the insert song in phase 07, 09, 41, edited & final plus – performed by Rie Tanaka as Lacus Clyne.

Catalog number: VICL-61555

Mobile Suit Gundam SEED Destiny Original Soundtrack II 

Mobile Suit Gundam SEED Destiny Original Soundtrack II is the second soundtrack album of Mobile Suit Gundam SEED Destiny. Included in this album is "Shinkai no Kodoku", the insert song used in phase 21, 26, 30, 32 & 33 – performed by Houko Kuwashima, Stellar Loussier's voice actress. In the remastered version of Gundam SEED Destiny, this song is used as the ending theme for phase 32.

Catalog number: VICL-61600

Mobile Suit Gundam SEED Destiny Original Soundtrack III 

Mobile Suit Gundam SEED Destiny Original Soundtrack III is the third soundtrack album of Mobile Suit Gundam SEED Destiny.

Catalog number: VICL-61610

Mobile Suit Gundam SEED Destiny Original Soundtrack IV 

Mobile Suit Gundam SEED Destiny Original Soundtrack IV is the last soundtrack album of Mobile Suit Gundam SEED Destiny.

Catalog number: VICL-61791

Opening themes

"Invoke"

"Invoke" is the 20th single released by T.M.Revolution. The song was used as the first opening theme for Mobile Suit Gundam SEED from phase 01 to 13.

Catalog number: ESCL-9090

Track listing
Invoke
Pied Piper
Invoke (phase shift armoured version)
Invoke (instrumental)

Charts

"Moment" 

"Moment" is a duet by Vivian Hsu and Kazuma Endō under the stage name Vivian or Kazuma. The song was used as the second opening theme for Mobile Suit Gundam SEED from phase 14 to 26.

Charts

"Moment" remixes 

"Moment" remixes" contains remixes and an instrumental version of the song "Moment" by Vivian or Kazuma.

Catalog number: SECL-108

Track listing
Moment (B4 ZA Beat remix)
Moment (Crude Reality remix)

Moment (MAF remix)
Moment (instrumental)

"Believe" 

"Believe" is the debut single of Nami Tamaki. The song was used as the third opening theme for Mobile Suit Gundam SEED from phase 27 to 40.

Catalog number: SRCL-6084

Track listing
Believe
Complete
Can you feel my love
Believe – instrumental

Charts

Believe Reproduction Gundam SEED edition 

Believe Reproduction Gundam SEED edition contains remixes of the song "Believe" by Nami Tamaki.

Catalog number: SRCL-6085

Track listing
Believe – Evidence01 mix
Believe – Freedom G Control mix
Final Memory
Final Memory – happy hardcore mix

"Realize" 

"Realize" is the second single released by Nami Tamaki. The song was used as the last opening theme for Mobile Suit Gundam SEED from phase 41 to 50.

Catalog number: SRCL-6088

Track listing
Realize
Hot summer day

Realize – instrumental

Charts

Realize Reproduction Gundam SEED edition 

Realize Reproduction Gundam SEED edition contains remixes and a TV opening mix of the song "Realize" by Nami Tamaki.

Catalog number: SRCL-6091

Track listing
Realize – KZ Strictly Uptempo mix
Realize – fly in to the Universe mix
Long Way Behind
Realize – Gundam SEED opening ver.

"Ignited" 

"Ignited" is the 23rd single released by T.M.Revolution. The song was used as the first opening theme for Mobile Suit Gundam SEED Destiny from phase 01 to 13.

Catalog number: ESCL-2598

Track listing

Charts

"Pride"

"Pride" is the debut single of High and Mighty Color. The song was used as the second opening theme for Mobile Suit Gundam SEED Destiny from phase 14 to 24 & edited.

Catalog number: SECL-140

Track listing
Pride

all alone
Pride (instrumental)

Charts

"Pride" remix 

"Pride" remix contains remixes of the song "Pride" by High and Mighty Color.

Catalog number: SECL-157

Track listing
Pride Nu school of mixture mix
Pride R&B norishiromix
Pride HΛL's mix 2005
Pride D.D.INOReMIX
Pride Real Latin Players mix
Pride "Phantom pain" norishirobreakmegamix

Charts

"Bokutachi no Yukue" 

"Bokutachi no Yukue" is the debut single of Hitomi Takahashi. The song was used as the third opening theme for Mobile Suit Gundam SEED Destiny from phase 25 to 37.

Catalog number: SRCL-5900

Track listing

Bokutachi no Yukue -instrumental-

Charts

"Wings of Words" 

"Wings of Words" is the 15th single of Chemistry, this single was released in two formats with different track lists. The song "Wings of Words" was used as the last opening theme for Mobile Suit Gundam SEED Destiny from phase 38 to 50.

Catalog numbers: DFCL-1211 (limited edition); DFCL-1212 (regular edition)

Limited edition track listing
Wings of Words

Bugsy Night feat. DABO
Change The World
Regular edition track listing
Wings of Words
Change The World
Wings of Words (alas de palabras)
Wings of Words (instrumental)

Charts

Ending themes

"Anna ni Issho Datta no ni" 

"Anna ni Issho Datta no ni" is the 9th single released by See-Saw. The song was used as the first ending theme for Mobile Suit Gundam SEED, from phase 01 to 26.

Catalog number: VICL-35440

Track listing

Anna ni Issho Datta no ni (karaoke)
Tsuki Hitotsu (karaoke)

Charts

"River"

"River / Mizuiro no Ame" is the 12th single released by Tatsuya Ishii. The song "River" was used as the second ending theme for Mobile Suit Gundam SEED, from phase 27 to 39.

Catalog number: SRCL-6082

Track listing
River

Charts

"River" Gundam SEED edition 

"River" Gundam SEED edition contains remixes and an instrumental version of the song "River" by Tatsuya Ishii.

Catalog number: SRCL-6086

Track listing
River
River remix
River piano instrumental
River backtracks

Charts

"Find The Way"

"Find The Way" is the 9th single released by Mika Nakashima. The song was used as the last ending theme for Mobile Suit Gundam SEED, from phase 40 to 50.

Catalog number: AICL-1676

Track listing
Find The Way
Find The Way (instrumental)

Find The Way (jamaals manatee mix by the orb)

Charts

"Reason" 

"Reason" is the 6th single released by Nami Tamaki. The song was used as the first ending theme for Mobile Suit Gundam SEED Destiny, from phase 01 to 13.

Catalog number: SRCL-5826

Track listing
Reason
Promised Land
Truth
Reason -Instrumental-

Charts

"Life Goes On" 

"Life Goes On" is the 11th single released by Mika Arisaka. The song was used as the second ending theme for Mobile Suit Gundam SEED Destiny, from phase 14 to 25 & edited.

Catalog number: VICL-35755

Track listing
Life Goes On

Life Goes On (original karaoke)
Toki no Sabaku (original karaoke)

Charts

"I Wanna Go to a Place..." 

"I Wanna Go to a Place..." is the third single released by Rie fu. The song was used as the third ending theme for Mobile Suit Gundam SEED Destiny, from phase 26 to 37, in phase 28 and 32, the English version was played instead of the Japanese version. In the remastered version of Gundam SEED Destiny, the song "Shinkai No Kodoku" is played as phase 32's ending theme instead.

Catalog number: QQCL-5

Track listing
I Wanna Go to a Place...
They Always Talk About
I So Wanted (English version)

Charts

"Kimi wa Boku ni Niteiru" 

"Kimi wa Boku ni Niteiru" is the 11th single released by See-Saw. The song was used as the last ending theme for Mobile Suit Gundam SEED Destiny, from phase 38 to 50, Final Plus and Special Edition IV - The Cost of Freedom.

Catalog number: VICL-35800

Track listing

Kimi wa Boku ni Niteiru [without vocal]
Seijaku wa Headphone no Naka [without vocal]

Charts

"Result" 

"Result" is the 11th single released by Nami Tamaki. The song was used as the ending theme for Mobile Suit Gundam SEED Destiny Special Edition I - The Broken World as well as the ending theme for Mobile Suit Gundam SEED Destiny HD remastered edition.

Catalog number: SRCL-6258

Track listing
Result
Making the pride
Stay Gold
Result -instrumental-

Charts

"Tears" 

"Tears" is the third single released by Lisa Komine under the stage name Lisa. The song was used as the ending theme for Mobile Suit Gundam SEED Destiny Special Edition II - Respective Swords.

Catalog number: VICL-36163

Track listing
Tears full version
Tears tsubura mix
Tears for you
Tears memories
Tears TV version
Tears original karaoke

Charts

"Enrai Tōku ni Aru Akari" 

"Enrai Tōku ni Aru Akari" is the 8th single released by High and Mighty Color. The song was used as the ending theme for Mobile Suit Gundam SEED DESTINY Special Edition III - The Hellfire of Destiny.

Catalog number: SECL-436

Track listing

Enrai ~Tōku ni Aru Akari~ (less vocal track)

Charts

"Stargazer Hoshi no Tobira" 

"Stargazer Hoshi no Tobira" is the debut single released by Satori Negishi. The song was used as the ending theme for Mobile Suit Gundam SEED C.E. 73: Stargazer.

Catalog number: VICL-36154

Track listing

Stargazer Hoshi no Tobira (original karaoke)
Mikazuki no Puzzle (original karaoke)

"Distance" 

"Distance" is FictionJunction's fourth single. The title track was used as ending theme song for Mobile Suit Gundam SEED HD remastered edition. "Eternal Blue" was used as opening theme song for the PSP game 戦律のストラタス (Senritsu no Stratus).

Track listing
Distance
Eternal Blue
Distance – instrumental
eternal blue – instrumental

Insert songs

"Akatsuki no Kuruma" 

"Akatsuki no Kuruma" is the third single released by FictionJunction Yuuka. The song was used as the insert song for Mobile Suit Gundam SEED in phase 24, 32 & 40.

Catalog number: VICL-35715

Track listing

Akatsuki no Kuruma piano version
Akatsuki no Kuruma acoustic version
Akatsuki no Kuruma without vocal

Charts

"Honoh no Tobira" 

"Honoh no Tobira" is the 4th single released by FictionJunction Yuuka. The song was used as the insert song for Mobile Suit Gundam SEED Destiny in phase 33 and 40.

Catalog number: VICL-35883

Track listing

Honoh no Tobira: hearty edition
Honoh no Tobira: instrumental edition
Honoh no Tobira (Original Karaoke)

Charts

"Vestige" 

"Vestige" is the 24th single released by T.M.Revolution. The song was used as the insert song for Mobile Suit Gundam SEED Destiny in phase 39, 41, 42 & 49 as well as the opening theme for Mobile Suit Gundam SEED DESTINY Final Plus: The Chosen Future. The song replaced "Wings of Words" as the fourth and final opening for the HD Remaster edition of Gundam SEED Destiny in 2013.

Catalog number: ESCL-2667

Track listing

crosswise

Charts

Complete Best albums

Mobile Suit Gundam SEED Complete Best 

Mobile Suit Gundam SEED Complete Best is the compilation of all opening and ending themes featured in Mobile Suit Gundam SEED TV series as well as the insert song "Meteor".

Catalog numbers: AICL-1489-90 (CD+DVD limited edition); AICL-1506 (CD only regular edition)

Track listing
"Invoke" by T.M.Revolution
"Anna ni Issho Datta no ni" by See-Saw (limited edition bonus track)
"Moment" by Vivian or Kazuma
"Believe" by Nami Tamaki
"River" by Tatsuya Ishii
"Realize" by Nami Tamaki
"Find The Way" by Mika Nakashima
"Meteor" by T.M.Revolution
"Invoke" (phase shift armoured version) by T.M.Revolution
"Moment" (B4 ZA Beat remix) by Vivian or Kazuma
Believe Freedom G Control mix by Nami Tamaki
"River" remix by Tatsuya Ishii
"Realize" – Everlasting mix by Nami Tamaki

Charts

Mobile Suit Gundam SEED Destiny Complete Best 

Mobile Suit Gundam SEED Destiny Complete Best is the compilation of all opening and ending themes featured in Mobile Suit Gundam SEED DESTINY TV series as well as the insert song "Meteor" and "vestige".

Catalog numbers: SMCL-111~2 (CD+DVD limited edition); SMCL-113 (CD only regular edition)

Track listing
"Ignited" by T.M.Revolution
"Reason" by Nami Tamaki
"Pride" by High and Mighty Color
"Life Goes On" by Mika Arisaka
"Bokutachi no Yukue" by Hitomi Takahashi
"I Wanna Go To A Place..." by Rie fu
"Wings of Words" by Chemistry
"Kimi wa Boku ni Niteiru" by See-Saw
Meteor by T.M.Revolution
"Vestige" by T.M.Revolution
"Reason" – Nylon Stay Cool Mix – by Nami Tamaki
Pride ~"Phantom pain" norishirobreakmegamix~ by High and Mighty Color
"Wings of Words (alas de palabras)" by Chemistry

Charts

Mobile Suit Gundam SEED – SEED Destiny Best "The Bridge" Across the Songs from Gundam SEED & SEED Destiny 

Mobile Suit Gundam SEED – SEED Destiny Best "The Bridge" Across the Songs from Gundam SEED & SEED Destiny is the compilation of ending themes, insert and character songs from Mobile Suit Gundam SEED and Mobile Suit Gundam SEED Destiny.

Catalog number: VICL-62050~1

CD1 track listing
"Anna ni Issho Datta" no ni by See-Saw
"Life Goes On" by Mika Arisaka
Akatsuki no Kuruma piano supplement version by FictionJunction Yuuka
Shinkai no Kodoku by Houko Kuwashima
"Honoh no Tobira" by FictionJunction Yuuka
"Tears" – full version by lisa
"Kimi wa Boku ni Niteiru" by See-Saw
Original Soundeffect Track – Memory – by Toshihiko Sahashi
Anna ni Issho Datta no ni 2006 by See-Saw

CD2 track listing
Ima Kono Shunkan ga Subete by Sōichirō Hoshi as Kira Yamato
Shizuka na Yoru ni by Rie Tanaka as Lacus Clyne
Precious Rose by Naomi Shindō as Cagalli Yula Athha
Shoot by Tomokazu Seki as Yzak Joule
Nicol no Piano "Namida no Theme" by Shinji Kakijima
Mizu no Akashi by Rie Tanaka as Lacus Clyne
Primal Innocence ~Bridge version by Kenichi Suzumura as Shinn Asuka
Eden of necessity by Junichi Suwabe as Sting Oakley
Pale repetition by Masakazu Morita as Auel Neider
Quiet Night C.E. 73 by Rie Tanaka as Meer Campbell
Emotion by Rie Tanaka as Meer Campbell
REY ZA Burrel's Piano "Omokage" by Shinji Kakijima
Please by Fumiko Orikasa as Meyrin Hawke and Megumi Toyoguchi as Miriallia Haw
Fields of hope by Rie Tanaka as Lacus Clyne
Tomorrow by Sōichirō Hoshi as Kira Yamato

Charts

Symphony Suit albums

Symphony SEED – Symphonic Suit Mobile Suit Gundam SEED 

Symphony SEED – Symphonic Suit Mobile Suit Gundam SEED is a collaboration album between Mobile Suit Gundam SEED music and London Symphony Orchestra.

Catalog number: VICL-61400

Track listing

Symphony SEED Destiny – Symphonic Suit Mobile Suit Gundam SEED Destiny 

Symphony SEED Destiny – Symphonic Suit Mobile Suit Gundam SEED Destiny is a collaboration album between Mobile Suit Gundam SEED Destiny music and London Symphony Orchestra.

Catalog number: VICL-61830

Track listing

Suit CDs

Mobile Suit Gundam SEED Suit CD vol.1 Strike X Kira Yamato 

Mobile Suit Gundam SEED Suit CD vol.1 Strike x Kira Yamato is the first suit CD of Mobile Suit Gundam SEED, featured image song of Kira Yamato, performed by Sōichirō Hoshi.

Catalog number: VICL-61071

Track listing
 by Sōichirō Hoshi as Kira Yamato
 (Suit Mini Drama)
 by Toshihiko Sahashi
Ima, Kono Shunkan ga Subete (Original Karaoke)

Mobile Suit Gundam SEED Suit CD vol.2 Athrun X Cagalli 

Mobile Suit Gundam SEED Suit CD vol.2 Athrun X Cagalli is the second suit CD of Mobile Suit Gundam SEED, featured image song of Cagalli Yula Athha, performed by Naomi Shindō.

Catalog number: VICL-61072

Track listing
Precious Rose by Naomi Shindō as Cagalli Yula Athha
 (Suit Mini Drama)
 by Toshihiko Sahashi
 by Toshihiko Sahashi
Precious Rose (Original Karaoke)

Mobile Suit Gundam SEED Suit CD vol.3 Lacus x Haro 

Mobile Suit Gundam SEED Suit CD vol.3 Lacus x Haro is the third suit CD of Mobile Suit Gundam SEED, featured "Mizu no Akashi", the insert song in phases 36 and 41, as well as in phase 10 of Gundam SEED Destiny, performed by Rie Tanaka as Lacus Clyne (and in SEED Destiny, Meer Campbell) in the series.

Catalog number: VICL-61073

Track listing
 by Rie Tanaka as Lacus Clyne
 (Suit Mini Drama)
 by Toshihiko Sahashi
Mizu no Akashi (Original Karaoke)

Mobile Suit Gundam SEED Suit CD vol.4 Miguel x Nicol 

Mobile Suit Gundam SEED Suit CD vol.4 Miguel x Nicol is the fourth suit CD of Mobile Suit Gundam SEED, featured insert song "Akatsuki no Kuruma", performed by FictionJunction Yuuka.

Catalog number: VICL-61074

Track listing
 by FictionJunction Yuuka
 (Suit Mini Drama)
 by Shinji Kakijima
 by Toshihiko Sahashi
Akatsuki no Kuruma (Original Karaoke)

Mobile Suit Gundam SEED Suit CD vol.5 Athrun x Yzak x Dearka 

Mobile Suit Gundam SEED Suit CD vol.5 Athrun x Yzak x Dearka is the fifth suit CD of Mobile Suit Gundam SEED, featured image song of Yzak Joule, performed by Tomokazu Seki.

Catalog number: VICL-61075

Track listing
Shoot by Tomokazu Seki as Yzak Joule
 (Suit Mini Drama)
 by Toshihiko Sahashi
 by Toshihiko Sahashi
 by Toshihiko Sahashi
 by Toshihiko Sahashi
 by Toshihiko Sahashi
 by Toshihiko Sahashi
Shoot (original karaoke)

Mobile Suit Gundam SEED Destiny Suit CD vol.6 Shinn Asuka x Destiny Gundam 

Mobile Suit Gundam SEED Destiny Suit CD vol.6 Shinn Asuka x Destiny Gundam is the first suit CD of Mobile Suit Gundam SEED Destiny, featured image song of Shinn Asuka, performed by Kenichi Suzumura.

Catalog number: VICL-61611

Track listing
Primal Innocence by Kenichi Suzumura as Shinn Asuka
 (suit mini drama)
Life Goes On TV-Size type1 by Mika Arisaka
 by Shinji Kakijima
THEME of MINERVA by Toshihiko Sahashi
Primal Innocence (without vocal)

Mobile Suit Gundam SEED Destiny Suit CD vol.7 Auel Neider x Sting Oakley 

Mobile Suit Gundam SEED Destiny Suit CD vol.7 Auel Neider x Sting Oakley is the second suit CD of Mobile Suit Gundam SEED Destiny, featured image song of Sting Oakley and Auel Neider, performed by Junichi Suwabe and Masakazu Morita.

Catalog number: VICL-61612

Track listing
Eden of necessity by Junichi Suwabe as Sting Oakley
 (suit mini drama)
Life Goes On TV-Size type2 by Mika Arisaka
 by Shinji Kakijima
ONE DAY by Toshihiko Sahashi
Pale repetition by Masakazu Morita as Auel Neider
Eden of necessity (without vocal)
Pale repetition (without vocal)

Mobile Suit Gundam SEED Destiny Suit CD vol.8 Lacus Clyne x Meer Campbell 

Mobile Suit Gundam SEED Destiny Suit CD vol.8 Lacus Clyne x Meer Campbell is the third suit CD of Mobile Suit Gundam SEED Destiny, featured insert song "Quiet Night C.E.73" and "Emotion", performed by Rie Tanaka as Meer Campbell in the series.

Catalog number: VICL-61613

Track listing
Quiet Night C.E.73 by Rie Tanaka as Meer Campbell
 (suit mini drama)
Life Goes On TV-Size type3 by Mika Arisaka
Emotion by Rie Tanaka as Meer Campbell
Theme of Archangel by Toshihiko Sahashi
Quiet Night C.E.73 (without vocal)
Emotion (without vocal)

Mobile Suit Gundam SEED Destiny Suit CD vol.9 Athrun Zala x ∞ Justice Gundam 

Mobile Suit Gundam SEED Destiny Suit CD vol.9 ATHRUN ZALA x ∞ JUSTICE GUNDAM is the fifth suit CD of Mobile Suit Gundam SEED Destiny, featured image song of Meyrin Hawke and Miriallia Haw, performed by Fumiko Orikasa and Megumi Toyoguchi.

Catalog number: VICL-61614

Track listing
Please by Fumiko Orikasa as Meyrin Hawke and Megumi Toyoguchi as Miriallia Haw
 (Suit Mini Drama)
Kimi wa Boku ni Niteiru TV-Size type1 by See-Saw
 by Toshihiko Sahashi
 by Toshihiko Sahashi
Please (without vocal)

Mobile Suit Gundam SEED Destiny Suit CD vol.10 Kira Yamato x Strike Freedom Gundam 

Mobile Suit Gundam SEED Destiny Suit CD vol.10 Kira Yamato x Strike Freedom Gundam is the fifth suit CD of Mobile Suit Gundam SEED Destiny, featured image song of Kira Yamato, performed by Sōichirō Hoshi.

Catalog number: VICL-61615

Track listing
Tomorrow by Sōichirō Hoshi as Kira Yamato
 (suit mini drama)
Kimi wa Boku ni Niteiru TV-Size type2 by See-Saw
 by Shinji Kakijima
 by Shinji Kakijima
 by Shinji Kakijima
 by Shinji Kakijima
TOMORROW (without vocal)

Others

Mobile Suit Gundam SEED & SEED Destiny Clipping 4 Songs 

Mobile Suit Gundam SEED & SEED Destiny Clipping 4 Songs is a DVD containing music videos of four songs from Mobile Suit Gundam SEED and Mobile Suit Gundam SEED Destiny.

Catalog number: VIBF-200

Track listing
Life Goes On by Mika Arisaka
Kimi wa Boku ni Niteiru by See-Saw
Honoh no Tobira by FictionJunction Yuuka
Anna ni Issho Datta no ni – 2006 mix by See-Saw

References

Anime soundtracks
Gundam lists
Mobile Suit Gundam SEED